The 1989 UK Championship (also known as the 1989 StormSeal UK Championship for sponsorship reasons) was a  professional ranking snooker tournament that took place between 17 November and 3 December 1989 at the Guild Hall in Preston, England. StormSeal became the new sponsor of the UK Championship. The televised stages were shown live on the BBC from 25 November to the final.

Defending champion Doug Mountjoy lost in the last 64 against rookie player Joe O'Boye. The 1988 runner-up Stephen Hendry won the first of his five UK titles by defeating six-times champion Steve Davis 16–12 in the final, taking Hendry on course for the number one spot in the world snooker rankings. The highest break of the tournament was a 141 made by Stephen Hendry.

Prize fund
The breakdown of prize money for this year is shown below:
Winner: £100,000
Runner-up: £48,000
Semi-final: £N/A
Quarter-final: £12,000
Highest break: £8,000
Total: £420,000

Main draw

Final

Century breaks

 141, 135, 123, 120, 112  Stephen Hendry
 139  Andrew Cairns
 138, 136, 126  Steve Davis
 127, 104  Tony Knowles
 127  Terry Griffiths
 127  John Parrott
 114  Neal Foulds
 114  Danny Fowler
 111  David Taylor
 110  Mark Bennett

 110  Brady Gollan
 108  Mike Hallett
 108  Brian Morgan
 107  Ian Brumby
 105  Stephen Murphy
 103  Darren Morgan
 102  Alain Robidoux
 101  Joe Johnson
 101  Barry West
 100  Mark Johnston-Allen

References

UK Championship (snooker)
UK Championship
UK Championship
UK Championship
UK Championship